Vilas is an unincorporated community in Bell County, in the U.S. state of Texas. According to the Handbook of Texas, the community had a population of 15 in 2011. It is located within the Killeen-Temple-Fort Hood metropolitan area.

History
Vilas was first settled in the 1880s, most likely by Czech settlers. A post office named Povilas was established in 1888 and remained in operation until 1906. It changed its name to Vilas in 1890 and had a general store and two mills. The community had three churches for Methodist, Baptist, and Disciples of Christ congregations. Its population was 25 in the 1940s, declined to 10 in 1964 with several scattered homes, and was listed on county maps in 2000. Its population was reported to be 15 in 2011.

Geography

Education
In 1903, Vilas had a school with one teacher and 49 students and remained in operation in the 1940s. Today, the community is served by the Holland Independent School District.

References

Czech communities in the United States
Unincorporated communities in Texas
Unincorporated communities in Bell County, Texas